Birgit Weise is an East German luger who competed during the mid-1980s. She won the bronze medal in the women's singles event at the 1985 FIL World Luge Championships in Oberhof, East Germany.

References
Hickok sports information on World champions in luge and skeleton.
SportQuick.com information on World champions in luge 

German female lugers
Living people
Year of birth missing (living people)